Thử thách cùng bước nhảy: So You Think You Can Dance is a Vietnamese televised dance competition and an entry in the international So You Think You Can Dance television franchise. The show is produced by Dong Tay Promotion Company and begins broadcasting its first season on September 15, 2012. Chí Anh from Bước nhảy hoàn vũ is set to be a permanent judge, with additional permanent judges yet to be announced. Guest judges include Ngô Thanh Vân, broadway staff John Huy Trần, choreographer Trần Ly Ly, rapper Việt Max, and host Thanh Bạch. The show's winner will receive 400 million đồng and a choice between several career advancement opportunities.

Format
The show will feature twenty-three episodes, and a format similar to that of the original U.S. series in season 2-8.  The first season will begin with three open audition episodes in which dancers (both professional and amateur, from any stylistic background and of ages from 16 to 30) can attempt to impress a panel of judges with their ability and earn a spot amongst the Top 100 competitors in the Ho Chi Minh City Semi-finals, which will represent one episode.  The various rounds of the semi-finals will reduce these 100 contestant to a Top 20, who will then be paired into ten couples that will go on to perform in nine successive live shows, each of which will be followed by a results show, all culminating in a live finale.

Auditions
Open auditions for the first season were held in the following locations:

HCMC week
The Ho Chi Minh City callbacks will be held in Ho Chi Minh City. Over 100 participating contestants will be cut down through successive rounds to a Top 20 who will be announced live during a dancer showcase episode.

Finals

Top 20 Finalists

Females

Males

Elimination Chart

 Quỳnh Trang injured about prior to performance show, then she was forced to "dance for life" on week 6.
 Thảo Uyên was injured since last week results show, then she was forced to "dance for life" on week 5 results show, but it was cancelled due to injury again and she voluntarily left the show.

Post-show
A spin-off miniseries named Liên hoan tài năng cùng bước nhảy (literally: Festival of Talents and Dances) was created and set to air from December 29, featuring notable contestants from the first season and their own dance crews. Beginning in week one is hip-hop theme show, named Festival HipHop Culture.

Syndication

See also
 Dance on television

References

External links
The official site of SYTYCD VN
SYTYCD on Facebook page
SYTYCD on ZingMe page
YouTube channel of SYTYCD VN

Season 01
2010s Vietnamese television series
2012 Vietnamese television seasons